Metaprosphera is a genus of moths of the family Erebidae. The genus was erected by George Hampson in 1926.

Species
Metaprosphera modesta (Butler, 1879) Brazil (Amazonas)
Metaprosphera sublimpida (Felder & Rogenhofer, 1874) Brazil (Amazonas)

References

Calpinae